Marie Antoinette is a historical drama television series created and written by Deborah Davis. It is produced by the BBC and Canal+ and based on the life of the last queen of France before the French Revolution, who was 14 years old when she became Dauphine of France upon her marriage to the heir apparent, Louis-Auguste.

The series premiered in France on 31 October 2022 and in the UK on 29 December, and consists of eight episodes. The series will premiere in the United States on 19 March 2023 on PBS. German actress Emilia Schüle plays the titular role.

Cast

Production

Development 
After the final season of Versailles aired, it was announced that Canal+ had commissioned Deborah Davis to write an eight-part series centred on Marie Antoinette. Alongside Banijay Studios and CAPA Drama the French production company planned to create an English language series with the aim to distribute to a wide international audience in a similar fashion to Versailles. In October 2021, it was announced that the BBC had pre-bought the series and the British broadcaster would be part of the production and distribution process. Vogue and Variety reported that the series is being created by an all-female writing team and would offer a "feminist take" on Marie Antoinette's life.

On 17 March 2023, Variety revealed that a second season had been commissioned with Davis as creator and a writing team led by Louise Ironside alongside Charlotte Wolf, Francesca Forristal and Andrew Bambfield. Ed Bazalgette will direct the first four episodes. "The upcoming season will portray how the royal couple at the height of their power faced an unprecedented financial crisis. The incessant attacks of Provence and Chartres against the royal couple stirred up the hatred of the nobles with disastrous consequences".

Casting 
Casting was announced in September 2021 with Schüle attached to play the lead role. She was joined by an international cast including Louis Cunningham, Jack Archer, Jasmine Blackborow, Gaia Weiss, James Purefoy, Marthe Keller, Roxane Duran, Crystal Shepherd-Cross, Caroline Piette, Oscar Lesage, Liah O'Prey, Jonas Bloquet, Nathan Willcocks, Paul Bandey, Laura Benson and Yoli Fuller.

Filming
In September 2021 it was announced filming had begun. Variety and Deadline reported that alongside the studios of Bry-Sur-Marne, filming would take place at locations that include the Châteaux of Versailles, Vaux-le-Vicomte, Palace of Fontainebleau, Lésigny, Champs and Voisins.

Release
Marie Antoinette premiered on the French network Canal+ in October 2022. The following month the series was distributed through BBC First in Australia and released on streamers Foxtel and Binge. Banijay also announced PBS had pre-bought the series with a planned spring 2023 release. The American premiere was later confirmed to be 19 March 2023.

The series made its UK debut on BBC Two and BBC iPlayer on 29 December 2022.

Episodes

Reception 
On Rotten Tomatoes, 57 percent of 7 reviews are positive for the series, and the average rating is 6.1/10. The Guardian gave the series four out of five, complimenting Schüle's performance and commenting "Strange, funny, grotesque in places... this drama from the writer of the Olivia Colman movie portrays the French queen as a naive and playful teenager – and it's hugely entertaining". Both TV Times and Weekend magazine gave five out of five, with the latter stating the series "weaves an extravagant tapestry of excess and intrigue".

The Telegraph gave three out of five, stating "after eight effervescent hours [Marie Antoinette] concludes in dynastic triumph" but "this is obviously not history". The Financial Times also gave three out of five, concluding that "for all the fastidious details of the ambitious production, Marie Antoinette can at times feel like an indulgent serving of cake, when what we crave is a bit more of the bread-and-butter of storytelling". The Evening Standard was more critical with a two-out-of-five review describing it as "a standard traditional period drama weighed down by expectation".

Variety featured the show as one of its critic picks for Best International Series of 2022, describing Schüle's performance as "riveting".

References

External links
 
 
 

2022 British television series debuts
2020s British drama television series
2022 French television series debuts
2020s French drama television series
Historical television series
English-language television shows
Epic television series
Family saga television series
Television series by Banijay
BBC television dramas
Canal+ original programming
Serial drama television series
Television series about dysfunctional families
Television shows about death
Television shows filmed in France
Cultural depictions of Marie Antoinette